Inger Klint (20 November 1890 – 7 January 1967) was a Danish foil fencer. She competed at the 1928 and 1932 Summer Olympics.

References

1890 births
1967 deaths
Danish female foil fencers
Olympic fencers of Denmark
Fencers at the 1928 Summer Olympics
Fencers at the 1932 Summer Olympics
Sportspeople from Copenhagen